Mursal, Azerbaijan may refer to:
Murğuzallı
Mürsəl